Nitrogen permease regulator 2-like protein (NPRL2) also known as tumor suppressor candidate 4 (TUSC4) is a protein that in humans is encoded by the NPRL2 gene.

References

Further reading